Evan Lee may refer to:

 Evan Lee (baseball)
 Evan Lee (soccer)